HMS Recruit was an R-class destroyer built for the Royal Navy during the First World War. She was sunk by a German U-boat four months after she was commissioned in April 1917.

Description
The Admiralty R class were enlarged versions of the preceding  fitted with geared steam turbines. They displaced  at normal load. Recruit was powered by a single Parsons geared steam turbine that drove two propeller shafts using steam provided by three Yarrow boilers. The ships' complement was 80 officers and ratings.

The Admiralty Rs were armed with three single QF  Mark IV guns. One gun was positioned on the forecastle; the second was on a platform between the funnels and the third at the stern. They were equipped with a single QF 2-pounder "pom-pom" anti-aircraft gun, on a platform between the two rotating twin mounts for  torpedoes amidships.

Construction and career
Recruit was ordered under the Sixth War Programme from William Doxford & Sons. The ship was laid down at the company's Sunderland shipyard at an unknown date, launched on 28 October 1916 and commissioned in April 1917.

In May 1917 the vessel was assigned to the Tenth Destroyer Flotilla as part of the Harwich Force.

References

Bibliography

 

Ships built on the River Wear
World War I destroyers of the United Kingdom
R-class destroyers (1916)
1916 ships